Tania Marmolejo (born September 5, 1975) is a Dominican born, Dominican Swedish American painter.

After studying Graphic Design and Illustration in the cities of Harstad and Kristiansand, Norway, Marmolejo graduated from Fine Arts and Illustration at the Altos De Chavon School of Design, Dominican Republic, 1998. She received the Charles Bludhorn Scholarship to continue studies at Parsons The New School for Design, in New York City, from where she graduated in 2000.

Tania Marmolejo currently lives in New York, where she works as an artist and designer.

Selected Awards, fellowships, recognitions
 2014   Selection, BID 2014, Madrid, Spain
 2010   New York State Assembly Honor
 2001   CINE Award I DMA Animation Studios. 'Freedom River' Hyperion/Disney. New York, NYC 
 2001   ASIFA Award I DMA Animation Studios. 'Freedom River' Hyperion/Disney. New York, NYC
 1998   Bludhorn Scholarship

Selected Individual exhibitions
 2020 Santas y Tígueras, Museum Candido Bido, Dominican Republic 
2018  (In Between), Galleri Nord-Norge, Harstad, Norway
2018  Here Versus There, Lyle O Reitzel Gallery, New York, NY
2015  What was I thinking?, Lyle O. Reitzel Gallery, Dominican Republic
 2013  Delicious Torment, Lyle O. Reitzel Gallery, Dominican Republic
 2012  The Awakening, Deborah Colton Gallery, Houston, Texas
 2011  Toxic Longings, Sensei at Panda Gallery, New York, NY

Selected collective exhibitions

 2014 Ibero American Biennial of Design (BID 2014), Matadero, Madrid, Spain
 2012  InContext, ArtMiami, Lyle O. Reitzel Gallery Booth, Miami, FL
 2012   Extraordinay 5, Cafeina Wynwood Art Center, Miami, FL
 2011   Hyperboreans, Dacia Gallery, New York, NY
 2011   Enigmatic Visions, William Bennet Gallery, Soho, New York
 2015   MoCCA I NY Arts Festival, New York
 2011   PINTA Art Fair, Lyle O. Reitzel Gallery, New York
 2010   Hybrids, Queens Museum of Art, New York
 2009   XVII Ibero American Art Salon, Katzen Art Center, Washington DC
 2006   'The Vagina Monologues', Columbia Presbyterian, New York

Books

 I doodle therefore I am
To doodle or not to doodle (a book of possibilities)

Selected bibliography
 2015 De Tolentino, Marianne. "Tania Marmolejo piensa y pinta," Periódico Hoy, 3 Octubre, Dominican Republic
 2015 Lugo, Diana. "Tania Marmolejo: el Secreto de las miradas", Estilos Magazine, Diario Libre, 12 September, Dominican Republic
 2014 Blush Magazine, Anniversary Edition. Fashion Faces from Dominican Republic. September 2014. Pgs. 179-182. Interview
 2014 Hughes, Rebecca. "Tania Marmolejo: Artist, Designer and All Around Renaissance Woman," Casa Life Magazine. Year 9, vol. 1.
 2014 Badajoz, Joaquin. "Las nuevas poéticas de Tania Marmolejo, " El Nuevo Herald. Artes y Letras (cover). 24 August. 
 2012 MIAMI Magazine, Art Basel Edition. December 2012. Cover.
 2011 Aguirregomezcorta, Gonzalo: “Tres artista, tres maneras de ilustrar independientes. Tania Marmolejo: el arte de “doodlear” de una dominicana residente en Nueva York,” El Mundo, Spain. (MoCCA festival)

References

External links 
 Tania Marmolejo website
 Tania Marmolejo at Fourth Ibero-American Design Biennial in Madrid

Living people
1975 births
21st-century American painters
21st-century American women artists
Painters from New York City
American people of Dominican Republic descent
American women painters
People with acquired American citizenship